In algebra, an analytically irreducible ring is a local ring whose completion has no zero divisors. Geometrically this corresponds to a variety with only one analytic branch at a point.

 proved that if a local ring of an algebraic variety is a normal ring, then it is analytically irreducible. There are many examples of reduced and irreducible local rings that are analytically reducible, such as the local ring of a node of an irreducible curve, but it is hard to find examples that are also normal.  gave such an example of a normal Noetherian local ring that is analytically reducible.

Nagata's example

Suppose that K is a field of characteristic not 2, and K  is the formal power series ring over K in 2 variables. Let R be the subring of K  generated by x, y, and the elements zn and localized at these elements, where 
 is transcendental over K(x)

.
Then R[X]/(X 2–z1) is a normal Noetherian local ring that is analytically reducible.

References 

 

 

Commutative algebra